The Most Reverend William Marlborough Carter,  (1850–1941) was an Anglican bishop and archbishop in South Africa.

Family and education
Dr Carter was born on 11 July 1850, the son of the Rev. William Adolphus Carter (1815-1901), and nephew of the Rev. Canon T. T. Carter. He was educated at Eton and Pembroke College, Oxford. He was married to Hester Marion Rose, C.B.E.(1867-1944) in London in 1904. He died on 14 Feb 1941 at Bear Ash, Twyford, Berkshire, and was buried at Eton College.

His brother, Thomas Nevile Carter (1851–1879) played football for England in the second unofficial football match against Scotland, in November 1870.

Clerical career 
Dr Carter was ordained in 1874. He held curacies at Christ Church, West Bromwich and All Saints, Bakewell. He was secretary to the Eton Mission in Hackney until his appointment to the episcopate as Bishop of Zululand in 1891. He was consecrated a bishop at St Paul's Cathedral on 29 September 1891, by Edward Benson, Archbishop of Canterbury. He was translated to Pretoria after a unanimous election in the Episcopalian Assembly there in August 1902, and then to Cape Town in 1909 until 1930. He died on 14 February 1941.

Commemoration 
There is a memorial to him at St. George's Cathedral, Cape Town. Carter House at Herschel Girls' School is named in his honour, as he was archbishop when the school was founded and a member of the first school council.

Notes and references

External links 

 
 

1850 births
1941 deaths
People educated at Eton College
Alumni of Pembroke College, Oxford
Anglican bishops of Zululand
Anglican bishops of Pretoria
Anglican archbishops of Cape Town
19th-century Anglican Church of Southern Africa bishops
20th-century Anglican Church of Southern Africa bishops
20th-century Anglican archbishops
Knights Commander of the Order of St Michael and St George
British expatriates in South Africa